Rogério Schumann Rosso (born 30 August 1968) is a Brazilian lawyer, politician, and musician, affiliated to the Social Democratic Party (PSD).

Rosso was elected governor of the Federal District by the Legislative Chamber after the resignation of both governor and vice governor. After the end of his term on 1 January 2011, Rosso was elected federal deputy in the 2014 elections.

Rogério Rosso is also known for being the president of the 2016 Impeachment Special Committee in the Chamber of Deputies.

The deputy was candidate for Speaker of the Chamber  in the election of 13 July 2016, losing to the favorite and incumbent Speaker Rodrigo Maia (DEM-RJ).

References

External links
Official website

1968 births
Living people
People from Rio de Janeiro (city)
Brazilian Democratic Movement politicians
Social Democratic Party (Brazil, 2011) politicians
Members of the Chamber of Deputies (Brazil) from the Federal District
20th-century Brazilian lawyers
Brazilian people of Italian descent